Preaching Lies to the Righteous is the second album by British synthpop band Blue October.

Track listing
 Mistakes
 All I Need Is Now
 Stranded
 Closer to the Sky, than the Sea
 I Remember It Too
 While Easy Slips Away
 Casino
 Silent Partner
 Venice Is Crumbling
 Lust Is a very Dangerous Thing
 Leaving This Place
 Let the Sandman Descend

Personnel 
 Ross Carter: Vocals
 Glen Wisbey: Keyboards, programming
 Nic Johnston: Guitars
 Giles Pitcher: Guitars
 Backing vocals on "Stranded" by Zena James

Details 
All songs written by Glen Wisbey and Ross Carter

2001 albums
Blue October (British band) albums